This is a list of the bird species recorded in Sierra Leone. The avifauna of Sierra Leone include a total of 677 species.

This list's taxonomic treatment (designation and sequence of orders, families and species) and nomenclature (common and scientific names) follow the conventions of The Clements Checklist of Birds of the World, 2021 edition. The family accounts at the beginning of each heading reflect this taxonomy, as do the species counts found in each family account. Accidental species are included in the total species count for Sierra Leone.

The following tag has been used to highlight accidentals. The commonly occurring native species are untagged.

(A) Accidental - a species that rarely or accidentally occurs in Sierra Leone
(I) Introduced - a species introduced to Sierra Leone as a consequence, direct or indirect, of human actions

Ducks, geese, and waterfowl
Order: AnseriformesFamily: Anatidae

Anatidae includes the ducks and most duck-like waterfowl, such as geese and swans. These birds are adapted to an aquatic existence with webbed feet, flattened bills, and feathers that are excellent at shedding water due to an oily coating.

White-faced whistling-duck, Dendrocygna viduata
Fulvous whistling-duck, Dendrocygna bicolor (A)
Knob-billed duck, Sarkidiornis melanotos
Hartlaub's duck, Pteronetta hartlaubii
Egyptian goose, Alopochen aegyptiacus
Spur-winged goose, Plectropterus gambensis
African pygmy-goose, Nettapus auritus
Garganey, Spatula querquedula
Northern shoveler, Spatula clypeata (A)
Northern pintail, Anas acuta
Ferruginous duck, Aythya nyroca (A)
Tufted duck, Aythya fuligula (A)

Guineafowl
Order: GalliformesFamily: Numididae

Guineafowl are a group of African, seed-eating, ground-nesting birds that resemble partridges, but with featherless heads and spangled grey plumage.

Helmeted guineafowl, Numida meleagris
White-breasted guineafowl, Agelastes meleagrides
Crested guineafowl, Guttera pucherani

New World quail
Order: GalliformesFamily: Odontophoridae

Despite their family's common name, this species and one other are native to Africa.

 Stone partridge, Ptilopachus petrosus

Pheasants, grouse, and allies
Order: GalliformesFamily: Phasianidae

The Phasianidae are a family of terrestrial birds which consists of quails, snowcocks, francolins, spurfowls, tragopans, monals, pheasants, peafowls and jungle fowls. In general, they are plump (although they vary in size) and have broad, relatively short wings.

Blue quail, Synoicus adansonii
Common quail, Coturnix coturnix
Double-spurred francolin, Pternistis bicalcaratus
Ahanta francolin, Pternistis ahantensis
Latham's francolin, Peliperdix lathami

Flamingos
Order: PhoenicopteriformesFamily: Phoenicopteridae

Flamingos filter-feed on shellfish and algae. Their oddly shaped beaks are specially adapted to separate mud and silt from the food they consume and, uniquely, are used upside-down.

Greater flamingo, Phoenicopterus roseus
Lesser flamingo, Phoenicopterus minor

Grebes
Order: PodicipediformesFamily: Podicipedidae

Grebes are small to medium-large freshwater diving birds. They have lobed toes and are excellent swimmers and divers. However, they have their feet placed far back on the body, making them quite ungainly on land.

Little grebe, Tachybaptus ruficollis

Pigeons and doves
Order: ColumbiformesFamily: Columbidae

Pigeons and doves are stout-bodied birds with short necks and short slender bills with a fleshy cere.

Rock pigeon, Columba livia (I)
Speckled pigeon, Columba guinea
Afep pigeon, Columba unicincta
Bronze-naped pigeon, Columba iriditorques
Lemon dove, Columba larvata
European turtle-dove, Streptopelia turtur
Red-eyed dove, Streptopelia semitorquata
Vinaceous dove, Streptopelia vinacea
Laughing dove, Spilopelia senegalensis
Blue-spotted wood-dove, Turtur afer
Tambourine dove, Turtur tympanistria
Blue-headed wood-dove, Turtur brehmeri
Namaqua dove, Oena capensis (A)
African green-pigeon, Treron calva

Sandgrouse
Order: PterocliformesFamily: Pteroclidae

Sandgrouse have small, pigeon like heads and necks, but sturdy compact bodies. They have long pointed wings and sometimes tails and a fast direct flight. Flocks fly to watering holes at dawn and dusk. Their legs are feathered down to the toes.

Four-banded sandgrouse, Pterocles quadricinctus (A)

Bustards
Order: OtidiformesFamily: Otididae

Bustards are large terrestrial birds mainly associated with dry open country and steppes in the Old World. They are omnivorous and nest on the ground. They walk steadily on strong legs and big toes, pecking for food as they go. They have long broad wings with "fingered" wingtips and striking patterns in flight. Many have interesting mating displays.

Denham's bustard, Neotis denhami
Black-bellied bustard, Lissotis melanogaster

Turacos
Order: MusophagiformesFamily: Musophagidae

The turacos, plantain eaters and go-away-birds make up the bird family Musophagidae. They are medium-sized arboreal birds. The turacos and plantain eaters are brightly coloured, usually in blue, green or purple. The go-away birds are mostly grey and white.

Great blue turaco, Corythaeola cristata
Guinea turaco, Tauraco persa
Yellow-billed turaco, Tauraco macrorhynchus
Violet turaco, Musophaga violacea (A)
Western plantain-eater, Crinifer piscator

Cuckoos
Order: CuculiformesFamily: Cuculidae

The family Cuculidae includes cuckoos, roadrunners and anis. These birds are of variable size with slender bodies, long tails and strong legs. The Old World cuckoos are brood parasites.

Black-throated coucal, Centropus leucogaster
Senegal coucal, Centropus senegalensis
Blue-headed coucal, Centropus monachus
Black coucal, Centropus grillii
Blue malkoha, Ceuthmochares aereus
Great spotted cuckoo, Clamator glandarius
Levaillant's cuckoo, Clamator levaillantii
Pied cuckoo, Clamator jacobinus
Thick-billed cuckoo, Pachycoccyx audeberti
Dideric cuckoo, Chrysococcyx caprius
Klaas's cuckoo, Chrysococcyx klaas
Yellow-throated cuckoo, Chrysococcyx flavigularis
African emerald cuckoo, Chrysococcyx cupreus
Dusky long-tailed cuckoo, Cercococcyx mechowi
Olive long-tailed cuckoo, Cercococcyx olivinus
Black cuckoo, Cuculus clamosus
Red-chested cuckoo, Cuculus solitarius
African cuckoo, Cuculus gularis
Common cuckoo, Cuculus canorus

Nightjars and allies
Order: CaprimulgiformesFamily: Caprimulgidae

Nightjars are medium-sized nocturnal birds that usually nest on the ground. They have long wings, short legs and very short bills. Most have small feet, of little use for walking, and long pointed wings. Their soft plumage is camouflaged to resemble bark or leaves.

Pennant-winged nightjar, Caprimulgus vexillarius
Standard-winged nightjar, Caprimulgus longipennis
Brown nightjar, Caprimulgus binotatus (A)
Eurasian nightjar, Caprimulgus europaeus (A)
Black-shouldered nightjar, Caprimulgus nigriscapularis
Swamp nightjar, Caprimulgus natalensis
Plain nightjar, Caprimulgus inornatus
Freckled nightjar, Caprimulgus tristigma
Long-tailed nightjar, Caprimulgus climacurus

Swifts
Order: CaprimulgiformesFamily: Apodidae

Swifts are small birds which spend the majority of their lives flying. These birds have very short legs and never settle voluntarily on the ground, perching instead only on vertical surfaces. Many swifts have long swept-back wings which resemble a crescent or boomerang.

Mottled spinetail, Telacanthura ussheri (A)
Black spinetail, Telacanthura melanopygia
Sabine's spinetail, Rhaphidura sabini
Cassin's spinetail, Neafrapus cassini
Alpine swift, Apus melba (A)
Mottled swift, Apus aequatorialis
Common swift, Apus apus
Plain swift, Apus unicolor (A)
Pallid swift, Apus pallidus
African swift, Apus barbatus
Little swift, Apus affinis
White-rumped swift, Apus caffer
Bates's swift, Apus batesi
African palm-swift, Cypsiurus parvus

Flufftails
Order: GruiformesFamily: Sarothruridae

The flufftails are a small family of ground-dwelling birds found only in Madagascar and sub-Saharan Africa.

White-spotted flufftail, Sarothrura pulchra
Buff-spotted flufftail, Sarothrura elegans (A)
Red-chested flufftail, Sarothrura rufa

Rails, gallinules, and coots
Order: GruiformesFamily: Rallidae

Rallidae is a large family of small to medium-sized birds which includes the rails, crakes, coots and gallinules. Typically they inhabit dense vegetation in damp environments near lakes, swamps or rivers. In general they are shy and secretive birds, making them difficult to observe. Most species have strong legs and long toes which are well adapted to soft uneven surfaces. They tend to have short, rounded wings and to be weak fliers.

African rail, Rallus caerulescens (A)
African crake, Crex egregia
Gray-throated rail, Canirallus oculeus
Lesser moorhen, Paragallinula angulata
Eurasian moorhen, Gallinula chloropus
Allen's gallinule, Porphyrio alleni
African swamphen, Porphyrio madagascariensis
Nkulengu rail, Himantornis haematopus
Black crake, Zapornia flavirostris
Little crake, Zapornia parva
Baillon's crake, Zapornia pusilla

Finfoots
Order: GruiformesFamily: Heliornithidae

Heliornithidae is a small family of tropical birds with webbed lobes on their feet similar to those of grebes and coots.

African finfoot, Podica senegalensis

Cranes
Order: GruiformesFamily: Gruidae

Cranes are large, long-legged and long-necked birds. Unlike the similar-looking but unrelated herons, cranes fly with necks outstretched, not pulled back. Most have elaborate and noisy courting displays or "dances".

Black crowned-crane, Balearica pavonina

Thick-knees
Order: CharadriiformesFamily: Burhinidae

The thick-knees are a group of largely tropical waders in the family Burhinidae. They are found worldwide within the tropical zone, with some species also breeding in temperate Europe and Australia. They are medium to large waders with strong black or yellow-black bills, large yellow eyes and cryptic plumage. Despite being classed as waders, most species have a preference for arid or semi-arid habitats.

Eurasian thick-knee, Burhinus oedicnemus (A)
Senegal thick-knee, Burhinus senegalensis

Egyptian plover
Order: CharadriiformesFamily: Pluvianidae

The Egyptian plover is found across equatorial Africa and along the Nile River.

Egyptian plover, Pluvianus aegyptius

Stilts and avocets
Order: CharadriiformesFamily: Recurvirostridae

Recurvirostridae is a family of large wading birds, which includes the avocets and stilts. The avocets have long legs and long up-curved bills. The stilts have extremely long legs and long, thin, straight bills.

Black-winged stilt, Himantopus himantopus
Pied avocet, Recurvirostra avosetta

Oystercatchers
Order: CharadriiformesFamily: Haematopodidae

The oystercatchers are large and noisy plover-like birds, with strong bills used for smashing or prising open molluscs.

Eurasian oystercatcher, Haematopus ostralegus

Plovers and lapwings
Order: CharadriiformesFamily: Charadriidae

The family Charadriidae includes the plovers, dotterels and lapwings. They are small to medium-sized birds with compact bodies, short, thick necks and long, usually pointed, wings. They are found in open country worldwide, mostly in habitats near water.

Black-bellied plover, Pluvialis squatarola
European golden-plover, Pluvialis apricaria (A)
American golden-plover, Pluvialis dominica (A)
Spur-winged lapwing, Vanellus spinosus
White-headed lapwing, Vanellus albiceps
Senegal lapwing, Vanellus lugubris
Wattled lapwing, Vanellus senegallus
Caspian plover, Charadrius asiaticus (A)
Kittlitz's plover, Charadrius pecuarius
Kentish plover, Charadrius alexandrinus
Common ringed plover, Charadrius hiaticula
Little ringed plover, Charadrius dubius
Forbes's plover, Charadrius forbesi
White-fronted plover, Charadrius marginatus

Painted-snipes
Order: CharadriiformesFamily: Rostratulidae

Painted-snipes are short-legged, long-billed birds similar in shape to the true snipes, but more brightly coloured.

Greater painted-snipe, Rostratula benghalensis

Jacanas
Order: CharadriiformesFamily: Jacanidae

The jacanas are a group of tropical waders in the family Jacanidae. They are found throughout the tropics. They are identifiable by their huge feet and claws which enable them to walk on floating vegetation in the shallow lakes that are their preferred habitat.

Lesser jacana, Microparra capensis (A)
African jacana, Actophilornis africanus

Sandpipers and allies
Order: CharadriiformesFamily: Scolopacidae

Scolopacidae is a large diverse family of small to medium-sized shorebirds including the sandpipers, curlews, godwits, shanks, tattlers, woodcocks, snipes, dowitchers and phalaropes. The majority of these species eat small invertebrates picked out of the mud or soil. Variation in length of legs and bills enables multiple species to feed in the same habitat, particularly on the coast, without direct competition for food.

Whimbrel, Numenius phaeopus
Eurasian curlew, Numenius arquata
Bar-tailed godwit, Limosa lapponica
Black-tailed godwit, Limosa limosa
Ruddy turnstone, Arenaria interpres
Red knot, Calidris canutus
Ruff, Calidris pugnax
Curlew sandpiper, Calidris ferruginea
Temminck's stint, Calidris temminckii (A)
Sanderling, Calidris alba
Dunlin, Calidris alpina
Little stint, Calidris minuta
Buff-breasted sandpiper, Calidris subruficollis (A)
Pectoral sandpiper, Calidris melanotos (A)
Jack snipe, Lymnocryptes minimus
Great snipe, Gallinago media
Common snipe, Gallinago gallinago
Terek sandpiper, Xenus cinereus (A)
Red-necked phalarope, Phalaropus lobatus (A)
Red phalarope, Phalaropus fulicarius (A)
Common sandpiper, Actitis hypoleucos
Green sandpiper, Tringa ochropus
Spotted redshank, Tringa erythropus
Common greenshank, Tringa nebularia
Marsh sandpiper, Tringa stagnatilis
Wood sandpiper, Tringa glareola
Common redshank, Tringa totanus

Buttonquail
Order: CharadriiformesFamily: Turnicidae

The buttonquail are small, drab, running birds which resemble the true quails. The female is the brighter of the sexes and initiates courtship. The male incubates the eggs and tends the young.

Small buttonquail, Turnix sylvatica
Black-rumped buttonquail, Turnix nanus

Pratincoles and coursers
Order: CharadriiformesFamily: Glareolidae

Glareolidae is a family of wading birds comprising the pratincoles, which have short legs, long pointed wings and long forked tails, and the coursers, which have long legs, short wings and long, pointed bills which curve downwards.

Temminck's courser, Cursorius temminckii (A)
Collared pratincole, Glareola pratincola
Rock pratincole, Glareola nuchalis

Skuas and jaegers
Order: CharadriiformesFamily: Stercorariidae

The family Stercorariidae are, in general, medium to large birds, typically with grey or brown plumage, often with white markings on the wings. They nest on the ground in temperate and arctic regions and are long-distance migrants.

Pomarine jaeger, Stercorarius pomarinus
Parasitic jaeger, Stercorarius parasiticus (A)
Long-tailed jaeger, Stercorarius longicaudus

Gulls, terns, and skimmers
Order: CharadriiformesFamily: Laridae

Laridae is a family of medium to large seabirds, the gulls, terns, and skimmers. Gulls are typically grey or white, often with black markings on the head or wings. They have stout, longish bills and webbed feet. Terns are a group of generally medium to large seabirds typically with grey or white plumage, often with black markings on the head. Most terns hunt fish by diving but some pick insects off the surface of fresh water. Terns are generally long-lived birds, with several species known to live in excess of 30 years. Skimmers are a small family of tropical tern-like birds. They have an elongated lower mandible which they use to feed by flying low over the water surface and skimming the water for small fish.

Sabine's gull, Xema sabini
Gray-hooded gull, Chroicocephalus cirrocephalus
Black-headed gull, Chroicocephalus ridibundus (A)
Little gull, Hydrocoloeus minutus (A)
Lesser black-backed gull, Larus fuscus
Brown noddy, Anous stolidus (A)
Black noddy, Anous minutus (A)
Sooty tern, Onychoprion fuscatus (A)
Bridled tern, Onychoprion anaethetus (A)
Little tern, Sternula albifrons (A)
Gull-billed tern, Gelochelidon nilotica
Caspian tern, Hydroprogne caspia
Black tern, Chlidonias niger
White-winged tern, Chlidonias leucopterus
Whiskered tern, Chlidonias hybrida
Roseate tern, Sterna dougallii
Common tern, Sterna hirundo
Arctic tern, Sterna paradisaea
West African crested tern, Thalasseus albididorsalis
Sandwich tern, Thalasseus sandvicensis
Lesser crested tern, Thalasseus bengalensis (A)
African skimmer, Rynchops flavirostris

Southern storm-petrels
Order: ProcellariiformesFamily: Oceanitidae

The southern storm-petrels are relatives of the petrels and are the smallest seabirds. They feed on planktonic crustaceans and small fish picked from the surface, typically while hovering. The flight is fluttering and sometimes bat-like.

Wilson's storm-petrel, Oceanites oceanicus

Northern storm-petrels
Order: ProcellariiformesFamily: Hydrobatidae

Though the members of this family are similar in many respects to the southern storm-petrels, including their general appearance and habits, there are enough genetic differences to warrant their placement in a separate family.

European storm-petrel, Hydrobates pelagicus
Leach's storm-petrel, Hydrobates leucorhous
Band-rumped storm-petrel, Hydrobates castro

Shearwaters and petrels
Order: ProcellariiformesFamily: Procellariidae

The procellariids are the main group of medium-sized "true petrels", characterised by united nostrils with medium septum and a long outer functional primary.

Fea's petrel, Pterodroma feae (A)
Cory's shearwater, Calonectris diomedea
Manx shearwater, Puffinus puffinus (A)
Balearic shearwater, Puffinus mauretanicus (A)

Storks
Order: CiconiiformesFamily: Ciconiidae

Storks are large, long-legged, long-necked, wading birds with long, stout bills. Storks are mute, but bill-clattering is an important mode of communication at the nest. Their nests can be large and may be reused for many years. Many species are migratory.

African openbill, Anastomus lamelligerus
Abdim's stork, Ciconia abdimii
Woolly-necked stork, Ciconia episcopus
White stork, Ciconia ciconia (A)
Saddle-billed stork, Ephippiorhynchus senegalensis
Marabou stork, Leptoptilos crumenifer
Yellow-billed stork, Mycteria ibis

Boobies and gannets
Order: SuliformesFamily: Sulidae

The sulids comprise the gannets and boobies. Both groups are medium to large coastal seabirds that plunge-dive for fish.

Brown booby, Sula leucogaster (A)
Northern gannet, Morus bassanus

Anhingas
Order: SuliformesFamily: Anhingidae

Anhingas or darters are often called "snake-birds" because of their long thin neck, which gives a snake-like appearance when they swim with their bodies submerged. The males have black and dark-brown plumage, an erectile crest on the nape and a larger bill than the female. The females have much paler plumage especially on the neck and underparts. The darters have completely webbed feet and their legs are short and set far back on the body. Their plumage is somewhat permeable, like that of cormorants, and they spread their wings to dry after diving.

African darter, Anhinga melanogaster

Cormorants and shags
Order: SuliformesFamily: Phalacrocoracidae

Phalacrocoracidae is a family of medium to large coastal, fish-eating seabirds that includes cormorants and shags. Plumage colouration varies, with the majority having mainly dark plumage, some species being black-and-white and a few being colourful.

Long-tailed cormorant, Microcarbo africanus

Pelicans
Order: PelecaniformesFamily: Pelecanidae

Pelicans are large water birds with a distinctive pouch under their beak. As with other members of the order Pelecaniformes, they have webbed feet with four toes

Pink-backed pelican, Pelecanus rufescens

Hammerkop
Order: PelecaniformesFamily: Scopidae

The hammerkop is a medium-sized bird with a long shaggy crest. The shape of its head with a curved bill and crest at the back is reminiscent of a hammer, hence its name. Its plumage is drab-brown all over.

Hamerkop, Scopus umbretta

Herons, egrets, and bitterns
Order: PelecaniformesFamily: Ardeidae

The family Ardeidae contains the bitterns, herons and egrets. Herons and egrets are medium to large wading birds with long necks and legs. Bitterns tend to be shorter necked and more wary. Members of Ardeidae fly with their necks retracted, unlike other long-necked birds such as storks, ibises and spoonbills.

Little bittern, Ixobrychus minutus
Dwarf bittern, Ixobrychus sturmii
White-crested bittern, Tigriornis leucolophus
Gray heron, Ardea cinerea
Black-headed heron, Ardea melanocephala
Goliath heron, Ardea goliath
Purple heron, Ardea purpurea
Great egret, Ardea alba
Intermediate egret, Ardea intermedia
Little egret, Egretta garzetta
Western reef-heron, Egretta gularis
Black heron, Egretta ardesiaca
Cattle egret, Bubulcus ibis
Squacco heron, Ardeola ralloides
Striated heron, Butorides striata
Black-crowned night-heron, Nycticorax nycticorax
White-backed night-heron, Gorsachius leuconotus

Ibises and spoonbills
Order: PelecaniformesFamily: Threskiornithidae

Threskiornithidae is a family of large terrestrial and wading birds which includes the ibises and spoonbills. They have long, broad wings with 11 primary and about 20 secondary feathers. They are strong fliers and despite their size and weight, very capable soarers.

Glossy ibis, Plegadis falcinellus (A)
African sacred ibis, Threskiornis aethiopicus
Olive ibis, Bostrychia olivacea
Spot-breasted ibis, Bostrychia rara
Hadada ibis, Bostrychia hagedash
Eurasian spoonbill, Platalea leucorodia (A)
African spoonbill, Platalea alba

Osprey
Order: AccipitriformesFamily: Pandionidae

The family Pandionidae contains only one species, the osprey. The osprey is a medium-large raptor which is a specialist fish-eater with a worldwide distribution.

Osprey, Pandion haliaetus

Hawks, eagles, and kites
Order: AccipitriformesFamily: Accipitridae

Accipitridae is a family of birds of prey, which includes hawks, eagles, kites, harriers and Old World vultures. These birds have powerful hooked beaks for tearing flesh from their prey, strong legs, powerful talons and keen eyesight.

Black-winged kite, Elanus caeruleus
African harrier-hawk, Polyboroides typus
Palm-nut vulture, Gypohierax angolensis
European honey-buzzard, Pernis apivorus
African cuckoo-hawk, Aviceda cuculoides
Hooded vulture, Necrosyrtes monachus
White-backed vulture, Gyps africanus (A)
Rüppell's griffon, Gyps rueppelli (A)
Bateleur, Terathopius ecaudatus (A)
Congo serpent-eagle, Dryotriorchis spectabilis
Beaudouin's snake-eagle, Circaetus beaudouini (A)
Brown snake-eagle, Circaetus cinereus
Banded snake-eagle, Circaetus cinerascens
Bat hawk, Macheiramphus alcinus
Crowned eagle, Stephanoaetus coronatus
Martial eagle, Polemaetus bellicosus
Long-crested eagle, Lophaetus occipitalis
Wahlberg's eagle, Hieraaetus wahlbergi
Booted eagle, Hieraaetus pennatus
Ayres's hawk-eagle, Hieraaetus ayresii
Tawny eagle, Aquila rapax (A)
African hawk-eagle, Aquila spilogaster
Cassin's hawk-eagle, Aquila africana
Lizard buzzard, Kaupifalco monogrammicus
Dark chanting-goshawk, Melierax metabates (A)
Grasshopper buzzard, Butastur rufipennis
Eurasian marsh-harrier, Circus aeruginosus
Pallid harrier, Circus macrourus
Montagu's harrier, Circus pygargus (A)
Red-chested goshawk, Accipiter toussenelii
Shikra, Accipiter badius
Red-thighed sparrowhawk, Accipiter erythropus
Black goshawk, Accipiter melanoleucus
Long-tailed hawk, Urotriorchis macrourus
Black kite, Milvus migrans
African fish-eagle, Haliaeetus vocifer
Common buzzard, Buteo buteo (A)
Red-necked buzzard, Buteo auguralis

Barn-owls
Order: StrigiformesFamily: Tytonidae

Barn-owls are medium to large owls with large heads and characteristic heart-shaped faces. They have long strong legs with powerful talons.

Barn owl, Tyto alba

Owls
Order: StrigiformesFamily: Strigidae

The typical owls are small to large solitary nocturnal birds of prey. They have large forward-facing eyes and ears, a hawk-like beak and a conspicuous circle of feathers around each eye called a facial disk.

African scops-owl, Otus senegalensis
Northern white-faced owl, Ptilopsis leucotis
Grayish eagle-owl, Bubo cinerascens
Fraser's eagle-owl, Bubo poensis
Shelley's eagle-owl, Bubo shelleyi
Verreaux's eagle-owl, Bubo lacteus
Akun eagle-owl, Bubo leucostictus
Pel's fishing-owl, Scotopelia peli
Rufous fishing-owl, Scotopelia ussheri
Pearl-spotted owlet, Glaucidium perlatum
Red-chested owlet, Glaucidium tephronotum
African wood-owl, Strix woodfordii

Trogons
Order: TrogoniformesFamily: Trogonidae

The family Trogonidae includes trogons and quetzals. Found in tropical woodlands worldwide, they feed on insects and fruit, and their broad bills and weak legs reflect their diet and arboreal habits. Although their flight is fast, they are reluctant to fly any distance. Trogons have soft, often colourful, feathers with distinctive male and female plumage.

Narina trogon, Apaloderma narina

Hoopoes
Order: BucerotiformesFamily: Upupidae

Hoopoes have black, white and orangey-pink colouring with a large erectile crest on their head.

Eurasian hoopoe, Upupa epops

Woodhoopoes and scimitarbills
Order: BucerotiformesFamily: Phoeniculidae

The woodhoopoes are related to the kingfishers, rollers and hoopoes. They most resemble the hoopoes with their long curved bills, used to probe for insects, and short rounded wings. However, they differ in that they have metallic plumage, often blue, green or purple, and lack an erectile crest.

Green woodhoopoe, Phoeniculus purpureus
Black scimitarbill, Rhinopomastus aterrimus

Hornbills
Order: BucerotiformesFamily: Bucerotidae

Hornbills are a group of birds whose bill is shaped like a cow's horn, but without a twist, sometimes with a casque on the upper mandible. Frequently, the bill is brightly coloured.

Red-billed dwarf hornbill, Lophoceros camurus
African pied hornbill, Lophoceros fasciatus
African gray hornbill, Lophoceros nasutus
Western red-billed hornbill, Tockus kempi' (A)
Northern red-billed hornbill, Tockus erythrorhynchus' (A)
White-crested hornbill, Horizocerus albocristatus
Black dwarf hornbill, Horizocerus hartlaubi
Black-casqued hornbill, Ceratogymna atrata
Yellow-casqued hornbill, Ceratogymna elata
Black-and-white-casqued hornbill, Bycanistes subcylindricus
Brown-cheeked hornbill, Bycanistes cylindricus
Piping hornbill, Bycanistes fistulator

Kingfishers
Order: CoraciiformesFamily: Alcedinidae

Kingfishers are medium-sized birds with large heads, long, pointed bills, short legs and stubby tails.

Shining-blue kingfisher, Alcedo quadribrachys
Malachite kingfisher, Corythornis cristatus
White-bellied kingfisher, Corythornis leucogaster
African pygmy kingfisher, Ispidina picta
African dwarf kingfisher, Ispidina lecontei
Chocolate-backed kingfisher, Halcyon badia
Gray-headed kingfisher, Halcyon leucocephala
Woodland kingfisher, Halcyon senegalensis
Blue-breasted kingfisher, Halcyon malimbica
Striped kingfisher, Halcyon chelicuti
Giant kingfisher, Megaceryle maximus
Pied kingfisher, Ceryle rudis

Bee-eaters
Order: CoraciiformesFamily: Meropidae

The bee-eaters are a group of near passerine birds in the family Meropidae. Most species are found in Africa but others occur in southern Europe, Madagascar, Australia and New Guinea. They are characterised by richly coloured plumage, slender bodies and usually elongated central tail feathers. All are colourful and have long downturned bills and pointed wings, which give them a swallow-like appearance when seen from afar.

Black bee-eater, Merops gularis
Blue-moustached bee-eater, Merops mentalis
Red-throated bee-eater, Merops bulocki (A)
Little bee-eater, Merops pusillus
Swallow-tailed bee-eater, Merops hirundineus
White-throated bee-eater, Merops albicollis
Blue-cheeked bee-eater, Merops persicus
European bee-eater, Merops apiaster
Northern carmine bee-eater, Merops nubicus

Rollers
Order: CoraciiformesFamily: Coraciidae

Rollers resemble crows in size and build, but are more closely related to the kingfishers and bee-eaters. They share the colourful appearance of those groups with blues and browns predominating. The two inner front toes are connected, but the outer toe is not.

Abyssinian roller, Coracias abyssinica
Rufous-crowned roller, Coracias naevia (A)
Blue-bellied roller, Coracias cyanogaster
Broad-billed roller, Eurystomus glaucurus
Blue-throated roller, Eurystomus gularis
Dollarbird, Eurystomus orientalis

African barbets
Order: PiciformesFamily: Lybiidae

The African barbets are plump birds, with short necks and large heads. They get their name from the bristles which fringe their heavy bills. Most species are brightly coloured.

Yellow-billed barbet, Trachyphonus purpuratus
Bristle-nosed barbet, Gymnobucco peli
Naked-faced barbet, Gymnobucco calvus
Speckled tinkerbird, Pogoniulus scolopaceus
Red-rumped tinkerbird, Pogoniulus atroflavus
Yellow-throated tinkerbird, Pogoniulus subsulphureus
Yellow-rumped tinkerbird, Pogoniulus bilineatus
Yellow-fronted tinkerbird, Pogoniulus chrysoconus
Yellow-spotted barbet, Buccanodon duchaillui
Hairy-breasted barbet, Tricholaema hirsuta
Vieillot's barbet, Lybius vieilloti
Double-toothed barbet, Lybius bidentatus

Honeyguides
Order: PiciformesFamily: Indicatoridae

Honeyguides are among the few birds that feed on wax. They are named for the greater honeyguide which leads traditional honey-hunters to bees' nests and, after the hunters have harvested the honey, feeds on the remaining contents of the hive.

Cassin's honeyguide, Prodotiscus insignis
Yellow-footed honeyguide, Melignomon eisentrauti
Willcock's honeyguide, Indicator willcocksi
Least honeyguide, Indicator exilis
Thick-billed honeyguide, Indicator conirostris
Lesser honeyguide, Indicator minor
Spotted honeyguide, Indicator maculatus
Greater honeyguide, Indicator indicator
Lyre-tailed honeyguide, Melichneutes robustus

Woodpeckers
Order: PiciformesFamily: Picidae

Woodpeckers are small to medium-sized birds with chisel-like beaks, short legs, stiff tails and long tongues used for capturing insects. Some species have feet with two toes pointing forward and two backward, while several species have only three toes. Many woodpeckers have the habit of tapping noisily on tree trunks with their beaks.

Eurasian wryneck, Jynx torquilla
Melancholy woodpecker, Chloropicus lugubris
Cardinal woodpecker, Chloropicus fuscescens
Fire-bellied woodpecker, Chloropicus pyrrhogaster
Brown-backed woodpecker, Chloropicus obsoletus
African gray woodpecker, Chloropicus goertae
Brown-eared woodpecker, Campethera caroli
Buff-spotted woodpecker, Campethera nivosa
Little green woodpecker, Campethera maculosa
Fine-spotted woodpecker, Campethera punctuligera

Falcons and caracaras
Order: FalconiformesFamily: Falconidae

Falconidae is a family of diurnal birds of prey. They differ from hawks, eagles and kites in that they kill with their beaks instead of their talons.

Lesser kestrel, Falco naumanni
Eurasian kestrel, Falco tinnunculus
Fox kestrel, Falco alopex
Gray kestrel, Falco ardosiaceus
Red-necked falcon, Falco chicquera (A)
African hobby, Falco cuvierii
Peregrine falcon, Falco peregrinus

Old World parrots
Order: PsittaciformesFamily: Psittaculidae

Characteristic features of parrots include a strong curved bill, an upright stance, strong legs, and clawed zygodactyl feet. Many parrots are vividly coloured, and some are multi-coloured. Old World parrots are found from Africa east across south and southeast Asia and Oceania to Australia and New Zealand.

Rose-ringed parakeet, Psittacula krameri
Black-collared lovebird, Agapornis swindernianus
Red-headed lovebird, Agapornis pullarius

African and New World parrots
Order: PsittaciformesFamily: Psittacidae

Characteristic features of parrots include a strong curved bill, an upright stance, strong legs, and clawed zygodactyl feet. Many parrots are vividly coloured, and some are multi-coloured. Most of the more than 150 species in this family are found in the New World.

Gray parrot, Psittacus erithacus
Brown-necked parrot, Poicephalus robustus (A)
Senegal parrot, Poicephalus senegalus

African and green broadbills
Order: PasseriformesFamily: Calyptomenidae

The broadbills are small, brightly coloured birds, which feed on fruit and also take insects in flycatcher fashion, snapping their broad bills. Their habitat is canopies of wet forests.

African broadbill, Smithornis capensis
Rufous-sided broadbill, Smithornis rufolateralis

Pittas
Order: PasseriformesFamily: Pittidae

Pittas are medium-sized by passerine standards and are stocky, with fairly long, strong legs, short tails and stout bills. Many are brightly coloured. They spend the majority of their time on wet forest floors, eating snails, insects and similar invertebrates.

African pitta, Pitta angolensis

Cuckooshrikes
Order: PasseriformesFamily: Campephagidae

The cuckooshrikes are small to medium-sized passerine birds. They are predominantly greyish with white and black, although some species are brightly coloured.

White-breasted cuckooshrike, Coracina pectoralis
Ghana cuckooshrike, Campephaga lobata
Red-shouldered cuckooshrike, Campephaga phoenicea
Purple-throated cuckooshrike, Campephaga quiscalina
Blue cuckooshrike, Cyanograucalus azureus

Old World orioles
Order: PasseriformesFamily: Oriolidae

The Old World orioles are colourful passerine birds. They are not related to the New World orioles.

Eurasian golden oriole, Oriolus oriolus
African golden oriole, Oriolus auratus
Western black-headed oriole, Oriolus brachyrhynchus
Black-winged oriole, Oriolus nigripennis

Wattle-eyes and batises
Order: PasseriformesFamily: Platysteiridae

The wattle-eyes, or puffback flycatchers, are small stout passerine birds of the African tropics. They get their name from the brightly coloured fleshy eye decorations found in most species in this group.

Brown-throated wattle-eye, Platysteira cyanea
West African wattle-eye, Platysteira hormophora
Red-cheeked wattle-eye, Platysteira blissetti
Yellow-bellied wattle-eye, Platysteira concreta
Senegal batis, Batis senegalensis
West African batis, Batis occulta

Vangas, helmetshrikes, and allies
Order: PasseriformesFamily: Vangidae

The helmetshrikes are similar in build to the shrikes, but tend to be colourful species with distinctive crests or other head ornaments, such as wattles, from which they get their name.

White helmetshrike, Prionops plumatus
Red-billed helmetshrike, Prionops caniceps
African shrike-flycatcher, Megabyas flammulatus
Black-and-white shrike-flycatcher, Bias musicus

Bushshrikes and allies
Order: PasseriformesFamily: Malaconotidae

Bushshrikes are similar in habits to shrikes, hunting insects and other small prey from a perch on a bush. Although similar in build to the shrikes, these tend to be either colourful species or largely black; some species are quite secretive.

Brubru, Nilaus afer
Northern puffback, Dryoscopus gambensis
Sabine's puffback, Dryoscopus sabini
Marsh tchagra, Tchagra minuta
Black-crowned tchagra, Tchagra senegala
Brown-crowned tchagra, Tchagra australis
Turati's boubou, Laniarius turatii
Tropical boubou, Laniarius major
Yellow-crowned gonolek, Laniarius barbarus
Lowland sooty boubou, Laniarius leucorhynchus
Sulphur-breasted bushshrike, Telophorus sulfureopectus
Many-colored bushshrike, Telophorus multicolor
Fiery-breasted bushshrike, Malaconotus cruentus
Lagden's bushshrike, Malaconotus lagdeni
Gray-headed bushshrike, Malaconotus blanchoti

Drongos
Order: PasseriformesFamily: Dicruridae

The drongos are mostly black or dark grey in colour, sometimes with metallic tints. They have long forked tails, and some Asian species have elaborate tail decorations. They have short legs and sit very upright when perched, like a shrike. They flycatch or take prey from the ground.

Western square-tailed drongo, Dicrurus occidentalis
Shining drongo, Dicrurus atripennis
Glossy-backed drongo, Dicrurus divaricatus
Fanti drongo, Dicrurus atactus

Monarch flycatchers
Order: PasseriformesFamily: Monarchidae

The monarch flycatchers are small to medium-sized insectivorous passerines which hunt by flycatching.

Blue-headed crested-flycatcher, Trochocercus nitens
Black-headed paradise-flycatcher, Terpsiphone rufiventer
African paradise-flycatcher, Terpsiphone viridis

Shrikes
Order: PasseriformesFamily: Laniidae

Shrikes are passerine birds known for their habit of catching other birds and small animals and impaling the uneaten portions of their bodies on thorns. A typical shrike's beak is hooked, like a bird of prey.

Northern fiscal, Lanius humeralis
Woodchat shrike, Lanius senator
Yellow-billed shrike, Lanius corvinus

Crows, jays, and magpies
Order: PasseriformesFamily: Corvidae

The family Corvidae includes crows, ravens, jays, choughs, magpies, treepies, nutcrackers and ground jays. Corvids are above average in size among the Passeriformes, and some of the larger species show high levels of intelligence.

Piapiac, Ptilostomus afer
Pied crow, Corvus albus

Rockfowl

Order: PasseriformesFamily: Picathartidae

Rockfowl are lanky birds with crow-like bills, long necks, tails and legs, and strong feet adapted to terrestrial feeding. They are similar in size and structure to the completely unrelated roadrunners, but they hop rather than walk. They also have brightly coloured unfeathered heads.

White-necked rockfowl, Picathartes gymnocephalus

Hyliotas
Order: PasseriformesFamily: Hyliotidae

The members of this small family, all of genus Hyliota, are birds of the forest canopy. They tend to feed in mixed-species flocks.

Yellow-bellied hyliota, Hyliota flavigaster
Violet-backed hyliota, Hyliota violacea

Fairy flycatchers
Order: PasseriformesFamily: Stenostiridae

Most of the species of this small family are found in Africa, though a few inhabit tropical Asia. They are not closely related to other birds called "flycatchers".

African blue flycatcher, Elminia longicauda
Dusky crested-flycatcher, Elminia nigromitrata

Tits, chickadees, and titmice
Order: PasseriformesFamily: Paridae

The Paridae are mainly small stocky woodland species with short stout bills. Some have crests. They are adaptable birds, with a mixed diet including seeds and insects.

White-shouldered black-tit, Melaniparus guineensis
Dusky tit, Melaniparus funereus

Larks
Order: PasseriformesFamily: Alaudidae

Larks are small terrestrial birds with often extravagant songs and display flights. Most larks are fairly dull in appearance. Their food is insects and seeds.

Rufous-rumped lark, Pinarocorys erythropygia
Rufous-naped lark, Mirafra africana
Sun lark, Galerida modesta
Crested lark, Galerida cristata

Nicators
Order: PasseriformesFamily: Nicatoridae

The nicators are shrike-like, with hooked bills. They are endemic to sub-Saharan Africa.

Western nicator, Nicator chloris

African warblers
Order: PasseriformesFamily: Macrosphenidae

African warblers are small to medium-sized insectivores which are found in a wide variety of habitats south of the Sahara.

Green crombec, Sylvietta virens
Lemon-bellied crombec, Sylvietta denti
Northern crombec, Sylvietta brachyura
Moustached grass-warbler, Melocichla mentalis
Kemp's longbill, Macrosphenus kempi
Gray longbill, Macrosphenus concolor
Green hylia, Hylia prasina
Tit-hylia, Pholidornis rushiae

Cisticolas and allies
Order: PasseriformesFamily: Cisticolidae

The Cisticolidae are warblers found mainly in warmer southern regions of the Old World. They are generally very small birds of drab brown or grey appearance found in open country such as grassland or scrub.

Senegal eremomela, Eremomela pusilla
Rufous-crowned eremomela, Eremomela badiceps
Sierra Leone prinia, Schistolais leontica
Green-backed camaroptera, Camaroptera brachyura
Yellow-browed camaroptera, Camaroptera superciliaris
Olive-green camaroptera, Camaroptera chloronota
Black-capped apalis, Apalis nigriceps
Yellow-breasted apalis, Apalis flavida
Sharpe's apalis, Apalis sharpii
Tawny-flanked prinia, Prinia subflava
Red-winged prinia, Prinia erythroptera
Black-capped rufous-warbler, Bathmocercus cerviniventris
Oriole warbler, Hypergerus atriceps
Red-faced cisticola, Cisticola erythrops
Singing cisticola, Cisticola cantans
Whistling cisticola, Cisticola lateralis
Chattering cisticola, Cisticola anonymus
Rock-loving cisticola, Cisticola aberrans
Dorst's cisticola, Cisticola guinea
Winding cisticola, Cisticola marginatus
Croaking cisticola, Cisticola natalensis
Siffling cisticola, Cisticola brachypterus
Rufous cisticola, Cisticola rufus
Zitting cisticola, Cisticola juncidis
Black-backed cisticola, Cisticola eximius

Reed warblers and allies
Order: PasseriformesFamily: Acrocephalidae

The members of this family are usually rather large for "warblers". Most are rather plain olivaceous brown above with much yellow to beige below. They are usually found in open woodland, reedbeds, or tall grass. The family occurs mostly in southern to western Eurasia and surroundings, but it also ranges far into the Pacific, with some species in Africa.

Melodious warbler, Hippolais polyglotta
Sedge warbler, Acrocephalus schoenobaenus
Marsh warbler, Acrocephalus palustris (A)
Eurasian reed warbler, Acrocephalus scirpaceus
Great reed warbler, Acrocephalus arundinaceus

Grassbirds and allies
Order: PasseriformesFamily: Locustellidae

Locustellidae are a family of small insectivorous songbirds found mainly in Eurasia, Africa, and the Australian region. They are smallish birds with tails that are usually long and pointed, and tend to be drab brownish or buffy all over.

Fan-tailed grassbird, Catriscus brevirostris
Common grasshopper-warbler, Locustella naevia

Swallows
Order: PasseriformesFamily: Hirundinidae

The family Hirundinidae is adapted to aerial feeding. They have a slender streamlined body, long pointed wings and a short bill with a wide gape. The feet are adapted to perching rather than walking, and the front toes are partially joined at the base.

Bank swallow, Riparia riparia
Banded martin, Neophedina cincta (A)
Rock martin, Ptyonoprogne fuligula
Barn swallow, Hirundo rustica
Red-chested swallow, Hirundo lucida
Ethiopian swallow, Hirundo aethiopica (A)
White-throated blue swallow, Hirundo nigrita
Wire-tailed swallow, Hirundo smithii
Pied-winged swallow, Hirundo leucosoma
Red-rumped swallow, Cecropis daurica
Lesser striped swallow, Cecropis abyssinica
Rufous-chested swallow, Cecropis semirufa
Preuss's swallow, Petrochelidon preussi
Common house-martin, Delichon urbicum
Square-tailed sawwing, Psalidoprocne nitens
Fanti sawwing, Psalidoprocne obscura
Gray-rumped swallow, Pseudhirundo griseopyga

Bulbuls
Order: PasseriformesFamily: Pycnonotidae

Bulbuls are medium-sized songbirds. Some are colourful with yellow, red or orange vents, cheeks, throats or supercilia, but most are drab, with uniform olive-brown to black plumage. Some species have distinct crests.

Slender-billed greenbul, Stelgidillas gracilirostris
Golden greenbul, Calyptocichla serinus
Red-tailed bristlebill, Bleda syndactylus
Green-tailed bristlebill, Bleda eximius
Gray-headed bristlebill, Bleda canicapillus
Simple greenbul, Chlorocichla simplex
Honeyguide greenbul, Baeopogon indicator
Yellow-throated greenbul, Atimastillas flavicollis
Spotted greenbul, Ixonotus guttatus
Swamp greenbul, Thescelocichla leucopleura
Red-tailed greenbul, Criniger calurus
Western bearded-greenbul, Criniger barbatus
Yellow-bearded greenbul, Criniger olivaceus
Gray greenbul, Eurillas gracilis
Ansorge's greenbul, Eurillas ansorgei
Plain greenbul, Eurillas curvirostris
Yellow-whiskered greenbul, Eurillas latirostris
Little greenbul, Eurillas virens
Leaf-love, Phyllastrephus scandens
Baumann's greenbul, Phyllastrephus baumanni
Icterine greenbul, Phyllastrephus icterinus
White-throated greenbul, Phyllastrephus albigularis
Common bulbul, Pycnonotus barbatus

Leaf warblers
Order: PasseriformesFamily: Phylloscopidae

Leaf warblers are a family of small insectivorous birds found mostly in Eurasia and ranging into Wallacea and Africa. The species are of various sizes, often green-plumaged above and yellow below, or more subdued with greyish-green to greyish-brown colours.

Wood warbler, Phylloscopus sibilatrix
Willow warbler, Phylloscopus trochilus

Bush warblers and allies
Order: PasseriformesFamily: Scotocercidae

The members of this family are found throughout Africa, Asia, and Polynesia. Their taxonomy is in flux, and some authorities place genus Erythrocerus in another family.

Chestnut-capped flycatcher, Erythrocercus mccallii

Sylviid warblers, parrotbills, and allies
Order: PasseriformesFamily: Sylviidae

The family Sylviidae is a group of small insectivorous passerine birds. They mainly occur as breeding species, as the common name implies, in Europe, Asia and, to a lesser extent, Africa. Most are of generally undistinguished appearance, but many have distinctive songs.

Eurasian blackcap, Sylvia atricapilla
Garden warbler, Sylvia borin
Moltoni's warbler, Curruca subalpina (A)
Western subalpine warbler, Curruca iberiae (A)

White-eyes, yuhinas, and allies
Order: PasseriformesFamily: Zosteropidae

The white-eyes are small and mostly undistinguished, their plumage above being generally some dull colour like greenish-olive, but some species have a white or bright yellow throat, breast or lower parts, and several have buff flanks. As their name suggests, many species have a white ring around each eye.

Northern yellow white-eye, Zosterops senegalensis

Ground babblers and allies
Order: PasseriformesFamily: Pellorneidae

These small to medium-sized songbirds have soft fluffy plumage but are otherwise rather diverse. Members of the genus Illadopsis are found in forests, but some other genera are birds of scrublands.

Brown illadopsis, Illadopsis fulvescens
Pale-breasted illadopsis, Illadopsis rufipennis
Blackcap illadopsis, Illadopsis cleaveri
Rufous-winged illadopsis, Illadopsis rufescens
Puvel's illadopsis, Illadopsis puveli

Laughingthrushes and allies
Order: PasseriformesFamily: Leiothrichidae

The members of this family are diverse in size and colouration, though those of genus Turdoides tend to be brown or greyish. The family is found in Africa, India, and southeast Asia.

Blackcap babbler, Turdoides reinwardtii
Brown babbler, Turdoides plebejus
Capuchin babbler, Turdoides atripennis

Treecreepers
Order: PasseriformesFamily: Certhiidae

Treecreepers are small woodland birds, brown above and white below. They have thin pointed down-curved bills, which they use to extricate insects from bark. They have stiff tail feathers, like woodpeckers, which they use to support themselves on vertical trees.

African spotted creeper, Salpornis salvadori

Oxpeckers
Order: PasseriformesFamily: Buphagidae

As both the English and scientific names of these birds imply, they feed on ectoparasites, primarily ticks, found on large mammals.

Yellow-billed oxpecker, Buphagus africanus

Starlings
Order: PasseriformesFamily: Sturnidae

Starlings are small to medium-sized passerine birds. Their flight is strong and direct and they are very gregarious. Their preferred habitat is fairly open country. They eat insects and fruit. Plumage is typically dark with a metallic sheen.

Violet-backed starling, Cinnyricinclus leucogaster
Chestnut-winged starling, Onychognathus fulgidus
Narrow-tailed starling, Poeoptera lugubris
Copper-tailed starling, Hylopsar cupreocauda
Long-tailed glossy-starling, Lamprotornis caudatus
Splendid starling, Lamprotornis splendidus
Lesser blue-eared starling, Lamprotornis chloropterus
Emerald starling, Lamprotornis iris
Purple starling, Lamprotornis purpureus
Bronze-tailed starling, Lamprotornis chalcurus

Thrushes and allies
Order: PasseriformesFamily: Turdidae

The thrushes are a group of passerine birds that occur mainly in the Old World. They are plump, soft plumaged, small to medium-sized insectivores or sometimes omnivores, often feeding on the ground. Many have attractive songs.

Finsch's flycatcher-thrush, Neocossyphus finschi
White-tailed ant-thrush, Neocossyphus poensis
Gray ground-thrush, Geokichla princei
African thrush, Turdus pelios

Old World flycatchers
Order: PasseriformesFamily: Muscicapidae

Old World flycatchers are a large group of small passerine birds native to the Old World. They are mainly small arboreal insectivores. The appearance of these birds is highly varied, but they mostly have weak songs and harsh calls.

Little flycatcher, Muscicapa epulata
Spotted flycatcher, Muscicapa striata
Swamp flycatcher, Muscicapa aquatica
Cassin's flycatcher, Muscicapa cassini
Ussher's flycatcher, Bradornis ussheri
Dusky-blue flycatcher, Bradornis comitatus
Pale flycatcher, Agricola pallidus
White-browed forest-flycatcher, Fraseria cinerascens
African forest-flycatcher, Fraseria ocreata
Gray-throated tit-flycatcher, Fraseria griseigularis
Gray tit-flycatcher, Fraseria plumbea
Olivaceous flycatcher, Fraseria olivascens
Tessmann's flycatcher, Fraseria tessmanni
Ashy flycatcher, Fraseria caerulescens
Nimba flycatcher, Melaenornis annamarulae 
Northern black-flycatcher, Melaenornis edolioides
White-tailed alethe, Alethe diademata
Forest scrub-robin, Cercotrichas leucosticta
Blue-shouldered robin-chat, Cossypha cyanocampter
Gray-winged robin-chat, Cossypha polioptera
Snowy-crowned robin-chat, Cossypha niveicapilla
White-crowned robin-chat, Cossypha albicapilla
Brown-chested alethe, Chamaetylas poliocephala
Forest robin, Stiphrornis erythrothorax
Lowland akalat, Sheppardia cyornithopsis
Common nightingale, Luscinia megarhynchos
European pied flycatcher, Ficedula hypoleuca
Common redstart, Phoenicurus phoenicurus
Rufous-tailed rock-thrush, Monticola saxatilis
Blue rock-thrush, Monticola solitarius
Whinchat, Saxicola rubetra
African stonechat, Saxicola torquatus 
Northern wheatear, Oenanthe oenanthe
White-fronted black-chat, Oenanthe albifrons

Sunbirds and spiderhunters
Order: PasseriformesFamily: Nectariniidae

The sunbirds and spiderhunters are very small passerine birds which feed largely on nectar, although they will also take insects, especially when feeding young. Flight is fast and direct on their short wings. Most species can take nectar by hovering like a hummingbird, but usually perch to feed.

Fraser's sunbird, Deleornis fraseri
Mouse-brown sunbird, Anthreptes gabonicus
Western violet-backed sunbird, Anthreptes longuemarei
Little green sunbird, Anthreptes seimundi
Green sunbird, Anthreptes rectirostris
Collared sunbird, Hedydipna collaris
Pygmy sunbird, Hedydipna platura
Green-headed sunbird, Cyanomitra verticalis
Blue-throated brown sunbird, Cyanomitra cyanolaema
Olive sunbird, Cyanomitra olivacea
Buff-throated sunbird, Chalcomitra adelberti
Carmelite sunbird, Chalcomitra fuliginosa
Scarlet-chested sunbird, Chalcomitra senegalensis
Olive-bellied sunbird, Cinnyris chloropygius
Tiny sunbird, Cinnyris minullus
Beautiful sunbird, Cinnyris pulchellus
Splendid sunbird, Cinnyris coccinigaster
Johanna's sunbird, Cinnyris johannae
Superb sunbird, Cinnyris superbus
Variable sunbird, Cinnyris venustus
Copper sunbird, Cinnyris cupreus

Weavers and allies
Order: PasseriformesFamily: Ploceidae

The weavers are small passerine birds related to the finches. They are seed-eating birds with rounded conical bills. The males of many species are brightly coloured, usually in red or yellow and black, some species show variation in colour only in the breeding season.

White-billed buffalo-weaver, Bubalornis albirostris
Speckle-fronted weaver, Sporopipes frontalis
Ballman's malimbe, Malimbus ballmanni
Red-vented malimbe, Malimbus scutatus
Blue-billed malimbe, Malimbus nitens
Crested malimbe, Malimbus malimbicus
Red-headed malimbe, Malimbus rubricollis
Slender-billed weaver, Ploceus pelzelni
Black-necked weaver, Ploceus nigricollis
Orange weaver, Ploceus aurantius
Heuglin's masked-weaver, Ploceus heuglini
Vieillot's weaver, Ploceus nigerrimus
Village weaver, Ploceus cucullatus
Yellow-mantled weaver, Ploceus tricolor
Maxwell's black weaver, Ploceus albinucha
Preuss's weaver, Ploceus preussi
Compact weaver, Pachyphantes superciliosus
Red-headed quelea, Quelea erythrops
Red-billed quelea, Quelea quelea
Northern red bishop, Euplectes franciscanus
Black-winged bishop, Euplectes hordeaceus
Yellow-crowned bishop, Euplectes afer
Yellow-mantled widowbird, Euplectes macroura
Red-collared widowbird, Euplectes ardens
Grosbeak weaver, Amblyospiza albifrons

Waxbills and allies
Order: PasseriformesFamily: Estrildidae

The estrildid finches are small passerine birds of the Old World tropics and Australasia. They are gregarious and often colonial seed eaters with short thick but pointed bills. They are all similar in structure and habits, but have wide variation in plumage colours and patterns.

Pale-fronted nigrita, Nigrita luteifrons
Gray-headed nigrita, Nigrita canicapilla
Chestnut-breasted nigrita, Nigrita bicolor
White-breasted nigrita, Nigrita fusconota
Red-fronted antpecker, Parmoptila rubrifrons
Gray-headed oliveback, Delacourella capistrata
Green-backed twinspot, Mandingoa nitidula
Lavender waxbill, Glaucestrilda caerulescens
Orange-cheeked waxbill, Estrilda melpoda
Black-rumped waxbill, Estrilda troglodytes
Common waxbill, Estrilda astrild
Western bluebill, Spermophaga haematina
Crimson seedcracker, Pyrenestes sanguineus
Dybowski's twinspot, Euschistospiza dybowskii
Red-faced pytilia, Pytilia hypogrammica
Red-winged pytilia, Pytilia phoenicoptera
Red-billed firefinch, Lagonosticta senegala
Bar-breasted firefinch, Lagonosticta rufopicta
Black-faced firefinch, Lagonosticta larvata
Black-bellied firefinch, Lagonosticta rara
African firefinch, Lagonosticta rubricata
Zebra waxbill, Amandava subflava
Quailfinch, Ortygospiza atricollis
Bronze mannikin, Spermestes cucullatus
Black-and-white mannikin, Spermestes bicolor
Magpie mannikin, Spermestes fringilloides
African silverbill, Euodice cantans

Indigobirds
Order: PasseriformesFamily: Viduidae

The indigobirds are finch-like species which usually have black or indigo predominating in their plumage. All are brood parasites, which lay their eggs in the nests of estrildid finches.

Pin-tailed whydah, Vidua macroura
Togo paradise-whydah, Vidua togoensis
Village indigobird, Vidua chalybeata
Quailfinch indigobird, Vidua nigeriae
Jambandu indigobird, Vidua raricola
Baka indigobird, Vidua larvaticola
Cameroon indigobird, Vidua camerunensis
Variable indigobird, Vidua funerea
Parasitic weaver, Anomalospiza imberbis

Old World sparrows
Order: PasseriformesFamily: Passeridae

Old World sparrows are small passerine birds. In general, sparrows tend to be small, plump, brown or grey birds with short tails and short powerful beaks. Sparrows are seed eaters, but they also consume small insects.

Northern gray-headed sparrow, Passer griseus
Sahel bush sparrow, Gymnoris dentata

Wagtails and pipits
Order: PasseriformesFamily: Motacillidae

Motacillidae is a family of small passerine birds with medium to long tails. They include the wagtails, longclaws and pipits. They are slender, ground feeding insectivores of open country.

Mountain wagtail, Motacilla clara
Western yellow wagtail, Motacilla flava
African pied wagtail, Motacilla aguimp
White wagtail, Motacilla alba
Long-billed pipit, Anthus similis
Tawny pipit, Anthus campestris (A)
Plain-backed pipit, Anthus leucophrys
Tree pipit, Anthus trivialis
Red-throated pipit, Anthus cervinus
Yellow-throated longclaw, Macronyx croceus

Finches, euphonias, and allies
Order: PasseriformesFamily: Fringillidae

Finches are seed-eating passerine birds, that are small to moderately large and have a strong beak, usually conical and in some species very large. All have twelve tail feathers and nine primaries. These birds have a bouncing flight with alternating bouts of flapping and gliding on closed wings, and most sing well.

White-rumped seedeater, Crithagra leucopygius
Yellow-fronted canary, Crithagra mozambicus
West African seedeater, Crithagra canicapilla
Streaky-headed seedeater, Crithagra gularis

Old World buntings
Order: PasseriformesFamily: Emberizidae

The emberizids are a large family of passerine birds. They are seed-eating birds with distinctively shaped bills. Many emberizid species have distinctive head patterns.

Brown-rumped bunting, Emberiza affinis
Ortolan bunting, Emberiza hortulana
Cabanis's bunting, Emberiza cabanisi
Gosling's bunting, Emberiza goslingi

See also
 Wildlife of Sierra Leone

General:
List of birds
Lists of birds by region

References

External links
Birds of Sierra Leone - World Institute for Conservation and Environment

Sierra Leone
Sierra Leone
Birds
Sierra Leone